Bhadrak Autonomous College was established on 6 July 1948 in Bhadrak, Odisha, India. At first, the college was affiliated to Utkal University for Intermediate Arts only. Intermediate Science classes were started in 1954-55. It is affiliated to Fakir Mohan University.

History
The college took its birth on 6th July 1948 with intermediate class in Arts only. Subsequently Science course started with construction of Science block in the year 1964. The degree courses in Arts, Science started in 1951 & 1961 respectively and Commerce in 1965.

The college was initially affiliated to Utkal University in the year 1948 and got affiliation to Fakir Mohan University after its establishment in the year 1999. In 2018, several PG courses were opened including Physics, Applied Physics, Applied Chemistry, Zoology  and Microbiology. Self financing B.Ed was opened from 2017-2018.

Campus
Bhadrak Autonomous College has a campus of 27 acres in the headquarters of Bhadrak district in the state of Odisha.

References

Affiliated Colleges to Fakir Mohan University
Universities and colleges in Odisha
Bhadrak district
Educational institutions established in 1948
1948 establishments in India